Bank of Tokyo Ltd v Karoon [1987] AC 45 is a conflict of laws case, which also relates to UK company law and piercing the corporate veil.

Facts
The Bank of Tokyo was a Japanese Bank operating in London and a wholly owned subsidiary of the Bank of Tokyo Trust Co, a New York corporation. Mr Karoon, an Iranian employee of the Iranian Maritime Co had personal accounts with both banks. He left Iran and transferred his money from the New York to the London bank. In February 1980 the London bank was notified that Mr Karoon was sentenced to prison by the Iranian government, and requested his assets be sent to the Iranian government. Mr Karoon asked the bank to transfer his accounts to another bank. The bank, unsure of what to do, applied for an interpleader summons and the money was eventually paid into court. Mr Karoon sued the New York bank claiming breach of the duty of confidentiality in disclosing information to the London bank, and the London bank sought to restrain him taking proceedings in the American courts.

Judgment
Robert Goff LJ held that it was for American law, as the forum conveniens, to determine whether the Bank of Tokyo Trust Co had committed a breach of contract, observing that it was a separate corporation from Bank of Tokyo. There were no reasons of public policy which required an injunction.

In the course of his judgment Robert Goff LJ observed,

See also

UK company law
Lifting the corporate veil

Notes

References

United Kingdom company case law
United Kingdom corporate personality case law
Court of Appeal (England and Wales) cases
1987 in case law
1987 in British law